Josef Hildebrand (born 7 May 1895, date of death unknown) was a Czech fencer. He competed in the team foil and sabre events at the 1936 Summer Olympics.

References

1895 births
Year of death missing
Czech male fencers
Czechoslovak male fencers
Olympic fencers of Czechoslovakia
Fencers at the 1936 Summer Olympics